A bedstead truss bridge is a kind of truss bridge whose vertical endposts are crucial, acting in compression.

References

 
Truss bridges by type